Amín Abel is a Santo Domingo Metro station on Line 1. It was open on 22 January 2009 as part of the inaugural section of Line 1 between Mamá Tingó and Centro de los Héroes. The station is between Joaquín Balaguer and Francisco Alberto Caamaño.

This is an underground station, built below Avenida Dr. Bernardo Correa y Cidrón. It is named to honor Amín Abel Hasbún. The station is located at the University of Santo Domingo and was previously known as Universidad.

References

Santo Domingo Metro stations
2009 establishments in the Dominican Republic
Railway stations opened in 2009